KBMW may refer to:

 KBMW (AM), a radio station (1450 AM) licensed to serve Breckenridge, Minnesota, United States
 KBMW-FM, a radio station (92.7 FM) licensed to serve Breckenridge, Minnesota